Charles Jarvis (11 November 1792 – October 1855) was an English first-class cricketer who played for Nottingham Cricket Club in the early 19th century. He played only one match recognised as first-class in 1826.

References

1792 births
1855 deaths
English cricketers
English cricketers of 1787 to 1825
English cricketers of 1826 to 1863
Nottingham Cricket Club cricketers
Cricketers from Nottingham